Cai Zhiyong may refer to:

Gerald Tsai (1929–2008), Chinese-American billionaire investor and philanthropist 
Chua Tee Yong (born 1977), Malaysian politician